Ada María Elflein (Buenos Aires, February 22, 1880 – ibid., July 24, 1919) was an Argentine poet, columnist, translator, feminist and teacher.

Her first works were mainly children's literature. Based on her work as a journalist, she was appointed a member of Journalism National Academy. Some schools, libraries and streets have her name.

Works 
Leyendas argentinas, 1906.
Del Pasado, 1910.
Cuentos de la Argentina, 1911. Geshichten aus Argentinien, published in German, her native language.
Tierra Santa, 1912.
Paisajes cordilleranos, 1917.
La Partida, 1918.
Por Campos históricos, 1926. Posthumous
De Tierra adentro, 1961. Posthumous

References

1880 births
1919 deaths
Argentine people of German descent
Argentine translators
Argentine women journalists
Argentine women poets
Argentine writers in German
Writers from Buenos Aires
20th-century women writers
20th-century translators
20th-century Argentine poets
20th-century Argentine writers